Tsidjé is a town located on the island of Grande Comore in the Comoros. It is located 2.98 miles (4.8 km) from the country's capital, Moroni.

Populated places in Grande Comore